Pocheon Citizen FC is a South Korean football club based in the city of Pocheon. The club is a member of the K3 League, a semi-professional league and the fourth tier of league football in South Korea.

Honours

Domestic
Challengers League / K3 League
Winners (6): 2009, 2012, 2013, 2015, 2016, 2017
Runners-up (1): 2014

Invitational
Sheikh Kamal International Club Cup
Runners-up (1): 2017

Season-by-season records

Players

Current squad 
As of 2 July 2022

Notable former players 

 In Chang-soo
 Cho Hyang-gi
 Cho Hyung-jae
 Hwang Hun-hee
 Lee Keun-ho
 Park Hyung-jin
 Park Jung-soo
 Manish Dangi

See also
 List of football clubs in South Korea

References

External links
 Pocheon Citizen FC official website 

K3 League (2007–2019) clubs
K4 League clubs
Sport in Gyeonggi Province
Pocheon
Association football clubs established in 2008
2008 establishments in South Korea